In Turkey and Northern Cyprus, a dolmuş is a share taxi that runs set routes within and between cities.

Background
Their name is derived from Turkish for "seemingly stuffed" referencing the fact that in days past these taxis were often filled to the brim. They depart from the terminal only when a sufficient number of passengers have boarded.

In some cities dolmuş are only allowed to board and disembark passengers at designated stops or at terminals; in less busy locations passengers may board anywhere along the route. In fact, a dolmuş with empty seats may slow to a crawl in the hopes of picking up a few more riders.

A foreign passenger described the ride as being "terrifying, awe-inspiring, confusing, incomprehensible, charming, hospitable and alien", and those unfamiliar with them may be surprised by the speed of dolmuş travel.

In Turkey the vehicles used are often brand-new minibuses, but in some parts of Cyprus –  – aging Mercedes-Benz stretch limos serving as dolmuş can still be seen.

Regulations

In Turkey the industry is regulated. Despite the meaning of their name, laws prevent these minibuses from becoming too crowded. In Turkish controlled Northern Cyprus, dolmuş routes are leased and vehicles are licensed.

See also
Dollar van
Marshrutka
Nanny van
Pesero
Public light bus Hong Kong
Share taxi
Songthaew

References

Share taxis
Turkish words and phrases
Public transport in Turkey